Vulcaniella peristrepta is a moth in the family Cosmopterigidae. It was described by Edward Meyrick in 1917 and is found in Pakistan.

References

Vulcaniella
Moths described in 1917